Alan Dary is an American professional actor and voice over artist.

Career
Dary is best known for his work on the Showtime series Brotherhood in which he played Representative Janakowski for 3 seasons starting in 2006.  A small role, Jankowski was partially responsible for the eventual shake up in the state house.

External links
Official website

Year of birth missing (living people)
Living people
American male voice actors
American male television actors
Male actors from Michigan